Of Walking in Ice is the diary of the German film director Werner Herzog, published in 1978 and reissued by University of Minnesota Press in 2015. It was written in German and translated into English.

Plot summary
The diary was written and takes place between November 23 and December 14, 1974. In the foreword, Herzog says that he received a call from a friend in Paris, informing him that his close friend, the German film historian Lotte H. Eisner, was ill and dying. Herzog was determined to prevent this, and believed that an act of walking would keep Eisner from death. He took a jacket, a compass and a duffel bag of the barest essentials and, wearing a pair of new boots, set off on a three-week pilgrimage from Munich to Paris through the deep chill and snowstorms of winter.

References

1978 non-fiction books
German non-fiction books
Werner Herzog
Diaries
University of Minnesota Press books